Bouteloua trifida is a species of grass known by the common name red grama. It is native to central and northern Mexico and the Southwestern United States, where it grows in desert scrub and other dry areas.

This is a small perennial grass growing up to about 30 centimeters in maximum height. It occasionally grows a small rhizome. The thready leaves are no more than 5 centimeters long. The inflorescence bears widely-spaced spikelets which are reddish purple in color. Each spikelet has three awns at the tip.

Typically it flowers between March and September.

External links

Jepson Manual Treatment
Photo gallery

trifida
Native grasses of California
Grasses of Mexico
Grasses of the United States
Flora of the Southwestern United States
Flora of the California desert regions
Flora of Northwestern Mexico
Flora without expected TNC conservation status